Georges Basin may refer to:

Georges Basin in the Gulf of Maine
George's Basin – a nineteenth-century dock in Liverpool, England